Guyan Township is one of the fifteen townships of Gallia County, Ohio, United States. As of the 2010 census the population was 1,166, 753 of whom lived in the unincorporated portions of the township.

Geography
Located in the southern part of the county along the Ohio River, it borders the following townships:
Harrison Township - north
Clay Township - northeast corner
Ohio Township - east
Rome Township, Lawrence County - south
Windsor Township, Lawrence County - southwest corner
Mason Township, Lawrence County - west
Walnut Township - northwest corner

Cabell County, West Virginia lies across the Ohio River to the southeast.

The farthest downstream Ohio River township in the county, it is also the most southerly township in the county.

The village of Crown City is located in southern Guyan Township.  It is the third smallest village in Gallia County.

Name and history
It is the only Guyan Township statewide.

Guyan Township was named after the creek that runs through it.

Government
The township is governed by a three-member board of trustees, who are elected in November of odd-numbered years to a four-year term beginning on the following January 1. Two are elected in the year after the presidential election and one is elected in the year before it. There is also an elected township fiscal officer, who serves a four-year term beginning on April 1 of the year after the election, which is held in November of the year before the presidential election. Vacancies in the fiscal officership or on the board of trustees are filled by the remaining trustees.

References

External links
County website

Townships in Gallia County, Ohio
Townships in Ohio